Æthelheard (meaning roughly "Noble Stern"), also spelled Ethelheard, Edelard or Æþelheard, was King of Wessex from 726 to 740. There is an unreliable record of Æthelheard having been the brother-in-law of his predecessor, Ine, but his ancestry is unknown, perhaps making him the first King of Wessex not to be descended from Cynric by blood.
Some sources identify him as the brother of Queen Æthelburg of Wessex, the wife of his predecessor, King Ine. His own successor Cuthred is identified in The Anglo-Saxon Chronicle as 'his relative'.

When Ine abdicated and went to Rome in 726, he left behind no obvious heir, and according to Bede simply left his kingdom "to younger men". In the wake of his departure, the West Saxon throne was disputed between Æthelheard and a rival claimant, Oswald. Oswald may have had the better claim, as the Anglo-Saxon Chronicle calls him a descendant of the early king Ceawlin, but it was Æthelheard who prevailed. It is possible that his success was due to the support of Æthelbald of Mercia, since he seems to have been subject to Æthelbald afterward. However, Æthelheard's lack of independence does not seem to have prevented Æthelbald from taking considerable territory from Wessex in 733, including the royal manor of Somerton.

Æthelheard married Frithugyth in 729 or before and she is recorded in the Chronicle as making a pilgrimage to Rome in 737.

Æthelheard was succeeded by Cuthred, possibly a brother or other relative.

See also
House of Wessex family tree

References

External links
 
  (but corresponding charters S249 and S250 are considered rather dubious)

West Saxon monarchs
740 deaths
8th-century English monarchs
Year of birth unknown
House of Wessex